Rose Stackpole (born 25 May 1995) is an Australian synchronized swimmer. She competed in the women's duet at the 2016 Summer Olympics.

References

1995 births
Living people
Australian synchronised swimmers
Olympic synchronised swimmers of Australia
Synchronized swimmers at the 2016 Summer Olympics
Place of birth missing (living people)
Artistic swimmers at the 2019 World Aquatics Championships
Swimmers from Auckland
New Zealand emigrants to Australia
Sportspeople from Perth, Western Australia
Sportswomen from Queensland
New Zealand synchronised swimmers